National Highway 705, commonly called NH 705 is a national highway in  India. It is a branch of National Highway 5. NH-705 traverses the state of Himachal Pradesh in India.

Route 
Theog, Kotkhai, Jubbal, Hatkoti.

Junctions  
 
  Terminal near Theog.
  Terminal near Hatkoti.

See also 
List of National Highways in India by highway number
List of National Highways in India by state

References

External links 
 NH 705 on OpenStreetMap

National highways in India
National Highways in Himachal Pradesh